Chuzah (also Romanized as Chūzah, Choozeh, Chowzeh, Chūza, and Chūzeh) is a village in Dodangeh-ye Sofla Rural District, Ziaabad District, Takestan County, Qazvin Province, Iran. At the 2006 census, its population was 1,265, in 298 families. This village is populated by Azerbaijani Turks.

References 

Populated places in Takestan County